The Moju River is a river in the east of Pará state in north-central Brazil. It is a tributary of the Acará River.

See also
List of rivers of Pará

References

Brazilian Ministry of Transport

Rivers of Pará